Wu Rui (died ), King Wen of Changsha, was an ancient Chinese general who helped Liu Bang establish the Han dynasty. A Baiyue magistrate of Po County under the Qin dynasty, he rose to become King of Hengshan during the collapse of Qin and was enfeoffed as King of Changsha during the early Han dynasty.

Life
An ethnic Yue, Wu Rui was the son of Wu Shen  Wú Shēn), formerly grand marshal  dà  sīmǎ, the highest military office) of the Chu state. During the Qin dynasty, Wu Rui was the magistrate of Po County, which had not yet flooded. He enjoyed high popularity among the local Baiyue people and was known as "Lord of the Po"  After Chen Sheng launched the Dazexiang Uprising against the Qin, Wu Rui organized a Baiyue army and joined the rebellion. Wu Rui's followers included Mei Xuan  Méi Xuān) and his son-in-law Ying Bu, both of whom assisted Liu Bang and played a major role in his victory against Qin and Xiang Yu. 

In  Wu Rui was bestowed the title King of Hengshan  Héngshān wáng) by Xiang Yu, as one of the 18 kings under the "Hegemon-King of Western Chu". In  after Liu Bang's victory in the Battle of Gaixia, Wu Rui, along with other kings loyal to Liu Bang, called the latter to take the title of emperor. After the foundation of Han dynasty, he was moved from Hengshan to become the King of Changsha. Wu Rui died shortly after reaching Linxiang (present-day Changsha), the capital of his new fief.

Legacy
Wu Rui was buried near Changsha. After his death, the kingdom passed to his son, Wu Chen  Wú Chén). His descendants honored him under the posthumous name King Wen ("the civil king"). His line was the only one among non-Liu family kings to survive past Liu Bang's reign. 

In the early Three Kingdoms Period, Wu Rui's tomb was demolished to provide the source of wood for a new temple for Sun Jian. The body was so well preserved that one of the participants later commented to Wu Gang  Wú Gāng) "colonel of the Nanman"  Nánmán xiàowèi) and a living descendant of Wu Rui, that he looked particularly similar to his ancestor.

References

202 BC deaths
Chu–Han contention people
Qin dynasty generals
Baiyue
Han dynasty generals